The 1998 European Cup was the 19th edition of the European Cup of athletics.

The Super League Finals were held in St. Petersburg, Russia. The first two teams qualfied for the 1998 IAAF World Cup

Super League

Held on 27 and 28 June in St. Petersburg, Russia

Team standings

Results summary

Men's events

Women's events

First League
The First League was held on 5 and 6 June

Men

Group A
Held in Budapest, Hungary

Group B
Held in Malmö, Sweden

Women

Group A
Held in Budapest, Hungary

Group B
Held in Malmö, Sweden

Second League
The Second League was held on 6 and 7 June

Men

Group A
Held in Kaunas, Lithuania

Group B
Held in Belgrade, Yugoslavia

Women

Group A
Held in Kaunas, Lithuania

Group B
Held in Belgrade, Yugoslavia

References

External links
European Cup results (Men) from GBR Athletics
European Cup results (Women) from GBR Athletics

European Cup (athletics)
European Cup
1998 in Russian sport
International athletics competitions hosted by Russia